Sri Lanka National Blind Cricket Team represents Sri Lanka at blind cricket. The Sri Lankan team have participated in every edition of the World Cup for Blind. It is run by the Sri Lanka Cricket Association of the Visually Handicapped. The team generally participates in One Day Internationals and T20Is.

In the inaugural edition of the ICC Blind Cricket World T20 held in 2012 in India, Sri Lanka finished third after losing to India in the semi-finals. Sri Lanka also went on to participate in the 2nd edition of the ICC Blind World T20 in 2017, which was also held in India. Sri Lanka once again went out in the semi-finals, losing to India by 10 wickets. Sri Lankan Blind cricket team set a world record for the highest ever opening stand of 334* against New Zealand in their opening match of the 2017 tournament.

In the 2017 Blind World T20, Sri Lanka's Suranga Sampath was the top run scorer with an aggregate of 733 runs in 8 innings with a total of 5 hundreds and a best score of 164*  He also managed to pick up 4 wickets during the tournament and was awarded "The player of the Tournament" for his all-round performance.

In 2016, the Blind Cricket team won the merit award at the Newsfirst Platinum Awards for the best performances at Blind Cricket level.

Tournament History

40 Over Blind Cricket World Cup 
 1998 Blind Cricket World Cup - Groupstage
 2002 Blind Cricket World Cup - Groupstage
 2006 Blind Cricket World Cup - Semifinalists
 2014 Blind Cricket World Cup - Semifinalists
 2018 Blind Cricket World Cup - Semifinalists

Blind T20 World Cup 
 2012 Blind World T20 - Semifinalists
 2017 Blind World T20 - Semifinalists

Blind T20 Asia Cup 
 2015 - Groupstage

See also 
Sri Lanka national deaf cricket team

References

Blind cricket teams
Sri Lanka in international cricket
National sports teams of Sri Lanka